Lauritz Jenssen Dorenfeldt may refer to:
Lauritz Jenssen Dorenfeldt (engineer) (1863–1932), Norwegian engineer
Lauritz Jenssen Dorenfeldt (jurist) (1909–1997), Norwegian jurist

See also
Lauritz Dorenfeldt Jenssen (1801–1859), Norwegian businessman